The Lesotho women's national football team is the national team of Lesotho and is controlled by the Lesotho Football Association.

History
The senior team is nicknamed the Beautiful Flowers.

On 28 March 1998, Lesotho played Mozambique in Mozambique. The game was tied 0–0 at the half before Mozambique scored three goals to win the game 3–0. In Maseru on 19 April 1998, Lesotho again played Mozambique. Lesotho was up 2–1 at the half and went on to win the game 4–2. In 2002, the team played 4 games. The country participated in the 2002 COSAFA Women's Championship in Harare, Zimbabwe. They were in Group A.  They lost on 19 April to Zimbabwe 0–15, lost to Malawi 0–3 on 21 April, and lost to Zambia 1–3 on 23 April. In 2003, the team played 1 game. In 2004, the team played 1 game. In 2005, the team played 2 games. In 2005, Zambia was supposed to host a regional COSAFA women's football tournament, with ten teams agreeing to send teams including South Africa, Zimbabwe, Mozambique, Malawi, Seychelles, Mauritius, Madagascar, Lesotho, Botswana, Namibia, Lesotho and Swaziland.

In 2006, the team had 3 training sessions a week and  played 2 games. The country participated in the 2006 Council of Southern Africa Football Associations women's tournament in Lusaka. They were in Group B. On 22 August, they lost to South Africa 0–9.  On 23 August, the team lost to Malawi 0–3. The national team's poor performance was contributed to by the fact that they only held a training camp for the competition a week before it started. In 2006, the national team coach was Lethola Masimong. Masimong wanted a national league created in the country in order to help develop the game and improve the national team's performance.  His comments came after the team was eliminated from the 2006 Confederation of Southern African Football Associations tournament.

In 2010, the country did not have a team competing in the African Women's Championships. The country did not have a team competing at the 2011 All Africa Games. In July 2011, the team played several games in Harare. On 2 July 2011, the Lesotho played Zimbabwe, losing 0–4.  On 2 July, they played Mozambique.  At half time, they were tied 2–2 but went on to win the game 3–2.  On 5 July, they lost to Malawi 2–5. The games were part of the 2011 COSAFA Women's Championship. On 17 August 2011, in a game in Maseru, they lost 0–4 to Mozambique.

In 2006, Lesotho women's national football team was ranked 125. In 2007, they were ranked 144.  In 2008, they were ranked 117. In 2009, they were ranked 92.  In 2010, they were ranked 128. In 2011, they were ranked 136. In March 2012, they were ranked 135th best in the world.  In June 2012, the team was ranked the 135th best in the world.

Background and development
Early development of the women's game at the time colonial powers brought football to the continent was limited as colonial powers in the region tended to take make concepts of patriarchy and women's participation in sport with them to local cultures that had similar concepts already embedded in them. The lack of later development of the national team on a wider international level symptomatic of all African teams is a result of several factors, including  limited access to education, poverty amongst women in the wider society, and fundamental inequality present in the society that occasionally allows for female specific human rights abuses.  When quality female football players are developed, they tend to leave for greater opportunities abroad. Continent wide, funding is also an issue, with most development money coming from FIFA, not the national football association. Future, success for women's football in Africa is dependent on improved facilities and access by women to these facilities.  Attempting to commercialise the game and make it commercially viable is not the solution, as demonstrated by the current existence of many youth and women's football camps held throughout the continent.  Nada Grkinic was FIFA's international development manager.  In 2007, one of her goals was to work on improving women's football in Africa and included work specifically pertaining to Lesotho.

The national federation was created in 1932. They joined  FIFA in 1964.  Their kit includes blue, white and green shirts, white shorts, and blue and white socks.

Football is the third most popular sport in the country, behind netball and athletics. Inside Lesotho, football is used to develop women's self-esteem. In 2006, there were 5,200 registered female football players, of which 5,000 were junior players and 200 were senior players.  The number of female players has been increasing. In 2000, there were 210 registered players. In 2001, there were 350 registered players. In 2002, there were 480 registered players. In 2003, there were 750 registered players. In 2004, there were 2,180 registered players. In 2005, there were 4,600 registered players. In 2006, there were 5,200 registered players.  In 2006, there were 61 total football clubs in the country, with 54 being mixed gendered teams and 7 being all women teams. Rights to broadcast the 2011 Women's World Cup in the country were bought by the African Union of Broadcasting.

Results and fixtures

The following is a list of match results in the last 12 months, as well as any future matches that have been scheduled.

1998

2002

2006

2011

2022

Coaching staff

Current coaching staff

Managerial history

  Lehloenya Nkhasi(20xx–2022)
 Pule Khojane (2022-)

Players

Current squad
The following players were named on 20 August  2022 for the 2022 COSAFA Women's Championship tournament.

Caps and goals accurate up to and including 30 October 2021.

Recent call-ups
The following players have been called up to the Lesotho in the past 12 months.

Previous squads
COSAFA Women's Championship
2022 COSAFA Women's Championship squad

Individual records

*Active players in bold, statistics correct as of 1 January 2022.

Most capped players

Top goalscorers

Competitive record

FIFA Women's World Cup

Olympic Games

*Draws include knockout matches decided on penalty kicks.

Africa Women Cup of Nations

African Games

Regional

COSAFA Women's Championship

*Draws include knockout matches decided on penalty kicks.

See also

 Sport in Lesotho
 Football in Lesotho
 Women's football in Lesotho
 Lesotho women's national under-17 team
 Lesotho women's national under-20 team
 Lesotho men's national football team

References

External links
 Official Lesotho Football Association website 

 
African women's national association football teams